Wilches is a surname. Notable people with the surname include:

Gustavo Wilches (born 1962), Colombian road cyclist
Pablo Wilches (born 1955), Colombian road cyclist

See also
Puerto Wilches, town and municipality in the Santander Department of Colombia